Pamphilius gyllenhali is a species of insect belonging to the family Pamphiliidae.

It is native to Europe.

Synonym:
 Lyda gyllenhali Dahlbom, 1835

References

Pamphiliidae